The following article documents the album, single, video and multimedia releases by the American rock band the Goo Goo Dolls.

Discography

Studio albums

Compilation albums

Extended plays

Singles

Promotional singles

Other charted songs

Soundtrack contributions

Videography

DVDs and videos

Official music videos

Notes

References

Discography
Discographies of American artists
Pop music group discographies
Rock music group discographies